"Return to Innocence" is a song by German musical group Enigma. It was released on 4 January 1994 as the lead single from their second album, The Cross of Changes (1993). It became the project's most successful international single after "Sadeness (Part I)", reaching number one in over 10 countries (including Ireland, Norway, Sweden and Zimbabwe), number three on the UK Singles Chart, and the top five in several countries, including Canada, Germany and New Zealand. It also reached the top 20 in France and number two on the Eurochart Hot 100. "Return to Innocence" was the project's biggest hit in the United States, reaching number two on the Billboard Modern Rock Tracks chart, number four on the Billboard Hot 100, and number six on the Billboard Mainstream Top 40.

History
The song's melodic and talking vocals in English are provided by Angel X (Andreas Harde), and a short talking vocal by Sandra ("Death is not the beginning of the end, that's the return to yourself, the return to innocence"), while an Amis chant ("Elders' Drinking Song") is repeated, which opens the song. Difang and Igay Duana, from the Amis, were in a cultural exchange program in Paris in 1988 when their performance of the song was recorded by the Maison des Cultures du Monde and later distributed on CD. The producer of Enigma, Michael Cretu, later obtained the CD and proceeded to sample it. In addition, the drum beat of the song was sampled from the Led Zeppelin song "When the Levee Breaks", played by John Bonham.

The song was used to promote several types of media in the mid-1990s, including film and TV commercials. In autumn 1994, the song was featured in an episode of the TV show My So-Called Life. In 1995, the song was used as the closing theme in Disney's live-action film Man of the House, as well as in the opening and closing of an Outer Limits episode. In 1996, the song was further popularised when it was used in a television advertisement to promote the 1996 Summer Olympics.

Legal dispute
In March 1998, Difang and Igay sued Cretu, Virgin Records and a number of recording companies for unauthorised use of their song without credit. The case was settled out of court for an undisclosed amount of money and all further releases of the song were credited (including royalties) to the Duanas. Cretu has stated that he had been led to believe that the recording was in the public domain and that he did not intentionally violate the Duanas' copyright.

Critical reception
Ned Raggett from AllMusic said that "Return to Innocence" is "not quite up there with "Sadeness" in the popular culture in the U.S. but almost inescapable elsewhere." Larry Flick from Billboard wrote that Enigma "resurfaces with a far more accessible, but no less cool pop/hip-hop kicker." He added, "The track's insistent beat is good bait for a song that is chock-full of unusual male chants and breathy female vamping. Somewhere between the two is an irresistible hook and melody that assures much-deserved success at both radio and club level." Troy J. Augusto from Cashbox noted, "Now, experts at the Virgin Records hitmaking laboratory have concocted a new, even more startling scenario: Enigma as hit song-makers! Wild, but true. The life's work of one Michael Cretu, a zealous Romanian attempting to go where no new age musician has gone before. Enigma is threatening to break free of the genre's tacky shackles, making the world safe for ambient artists everywhere." Dave Sholin from the Gavin Report called it "a haunting production that won't go by unnoticed."

Jonathan Riggs from Idolator commented, "If all of human existence across time were a movie, "Return to Innocence" is the song that should play over the end credits." He added, ""Return to Innocence" was then and remains now universally epic, instantly recognizable, largely incomprehensible and endlessly moving. Like us. Like life." Alan Jones from Music Week described it as a "mysterious new collage of sounds" and "a haunting and well-constructed piece that sets ethnic-sounding emoting and softly spoken phrases against a dance beat and a swirl of soft synth sounds." He stated, "Satisfying and unique." James Hamilton from the magazine's RM Dance Update declared it as a "slinkily atmospheric rolling sombre 0-88-0bpm Euro smash". John Kilgo from The Network Forty deemed it a "melodramatic chant". Charles Aaron for Entertainment Weekly noted that here, "group mastermind Michael Cretu replaces his familiar monkish chants (1991’s hit ”Sadeness”) with aboriginal croons, but the entrancing, mid-tempo groove remains, along with loopy female whispers." Richard Paton from Toledo Blade said that the song "captures that melange of sounds, the intensity of the beat, and the wafting vocals and chant".

Music video

English film, documentary and music video director Julien Temple directed the accompanying music video for "Return to Innocence", which depicts a man's life in reverse, starting with him dying and ending with his baptism as a baby. It received heavy rotation on MTV Europe and was A-listed on Germany's VIVA. Later, the video was published by Vevo on YouTube in March 2009. As of December 2022, it had generated more than 136 million views.

Track listings
 4-track CD single
 Radio Edit – 4:03
 Long & Alive Version (remixed by Curly M.C. and Jens Gad) – 7:07
 380 Midnight Mix (remixed by Jens Gad) – 5:55
 Short Radio Edit – 3:01

 5-track CD single
 Radio Edit – 4:03
 Long & Alive Version (remixed by Curly M.C. and Jens Gad) – 7:07
 380 Midnight Mix (remixed by Jens Gad) – 5:55
 Short Radio Edit – 3:01
 "Sadeness (Part I)" (Radio Edit) – 4:17

Charts

Weekly charts

Year-end charts

Certifications

Release history

References

External links

1994 singles
1994 songs
EMI Records singles
Enigma (German band) songs
Irish Singles Chart number-one singles
Music videos directed by Julien Temple
Number-one singles in Israel
Number-one singles in Norway
Number-one singles in Sweden
Number-one singles in Zimbabwe
Olympic songs
Song recordings produced by Michael Cretu
Songs involved in plagiarism controversies
Songs written by John Bonham
Songs written by Michael Cretu
Virgin Records singles

lt:Return To Innocence